State Road 227 is a north–south highway at the eastern edge of the U.S. state of Indiana.  It is nearly parallel with the Ohio state line.

Route description
State Road 227 begins in northeastern Union County at the point where Ohio State Route 177 meets the Ohio/Indiana border.  It runs north through Richmond with an interchange with Interstate 70 at Exit 153, and continues to State Road 32 near Union City.

History 
The Indiana State Highway Commission proposed SR 227 initially as part of the state road system by August 1930. This section of highway ran from Richmond to SR 28 (now SR 32) roughly along the modern routing. By September 30, 1930, the highway official became part of the state road system. SR 227 was extended south to the Ohio state line in late 1950 or early 1951, replacing SR 21.

Major intersections

References

External links

227
Transportation in Randolph County, Indiana
Transportation in Union County, Indiana
Transportation in Wayne County, Indiana